The following is the list of squads for each of the 16 teams competing in the FIBA EuroBasket 2005, held in Serbia and Montenegro between 15 and 25 September 2005. Each team selected a squad of 12 players for the tournament.

Group A

Germany

Italy

Russia

Ukraine

Group B

Bulgaria

Croatia

Lithuania

Turkey

Group C

Bosnia and Herzegovina

France

Greece

Slovenia

Group D

Israel

Latvia

Serbia and Montenegro

Spain

References
 2005 European Championship for Men, FIBA.com.

2005